Bathurst was a provincial electoral district for the Legislative Assembly of New Brunswick, Canada.

History and geography

It was created in the 1967 redistribution when cities were separated from their counties and made independent districts.  It was not changed in either the 1973 or 1994 redistributions but in 2006 it lost some territory to the neighbouring riding of Nepisiguit. It has been a traditional Liberal seat in the province; however, in the last two elections, it has been one of the most marginal seats in New Brunswick.

In its current form, it consists of the city of Bathurst except for the part south of Route 11 and east of the Nepisiguit River. It is bordered on the northeast by the riding of Nigadoo-Chaleur, on north by Chaleur Bay, and elsewhere by the riding of Nepisiguit.

Members of the Legislative Assembly
This riding has elected the following Members of Legislative Assembly:

Riding associations

Election results

2010 election

2006 election

2003 election

1999 election

1995 election

1991 election

1987 election

1982 election

1978 election

1974 election

1972 by-election

1970 election

1967 election

References

External links
Website of the Legislative Assembly of New Brunswick
Elections NB — Publications

Politics of Bathurst, New Brunswick
Former provincial electoral districts of New Brunswick